Khorramabad-e Sofla (also Romanized as Khorramābād-e Soflá; also known as Khorram Ābād, Khorramābād-e Pā’īn, and Khūrramābād) is a village in Hasanabad Rural District, in the Central District of Ravansar County, Kermanshah Province, Iran. At the 2006 census, its population was 444, in 103 families.

References 

Populated places in Ravansar County